Central Lee High School is a rural public high school located in Donnellson, Iowa, in Lee County.  It is part of the Central Lee Community School District.  Central Lee's mascots are the Hawks and Lady Hawks.

Central Lee High School draws students from the towns of: Argyle, Montrose, and Donnellson, Iowa. Others also come from Franklin, Iowa. Central Lee allows its students to participate in many activities such as the athletics listed below, cheerleading, and dance.

Central Lee also has musical programs to participate in such as choir, show choir, show band, band, jazz band, and marching band.

Athletics
The Hawks and Lady Hawks compete in the Southeast Iowa Superconference in the following sports:

Boys
Baseball
Basketball
Cross Country
Football
Golf
Soccer
Track & Field
Wrestling
Bowling

Girls
Basketball
Cross Country
Golf
Soccer
Softball
Track & Field
Volleyball
Bowling

Notable team state finishes
Boys Baseball: 1989 (1st) Class 3A
Boys Soccer: 2000 (4th) Class 1A
Girls Basketball: 2000 (2nd) Class 3A
Girls Cross Country: 1966 (1st)

See also
List of high schools in Iowa

References

External links
Central Lee Community Schools

Public high schools in Iowa
Schools in Lee County, Iowa